The fimbriate gudgeon (Oxyeleotris fimbriata) is a species of sleeper goby native to the fresh waters of New Guinea and Australia.

References

Oxyeleotris
Fish described in 1907
Freshwater fish of Australia

pt:Oxyeleotris wisselensis